IUA may refer to:

 International Underwriting Association
 International University of Africa
 Irish Union Association
 Irish Unionist Alliance
 Irish Universities Association
 ISDN User Adaptation, one of the protocols in the SIGTRAN family
 Interactive User Access CATIA (V4)
 Intrauterine adhesions (Asherman's syndrome)